The Men's madison at the 2011 European Track Championships was held on 23 October 2011 with 20 teams participating. Two heats were held to determine the final participants.

Medalists

Results

Qualifying
The top 8 teams of each heat advanced to the final. The races were held at 10:00.

Heat 1

Heat 2

Final
The race was held at 16:21.

References

2011 European Track Championships
European Track Championships – Men's madison